The 1978–79 WHA season was the seventh and final season of the World Hockey Association (WHA). Prior to the start of the season, the Houston Aeros folded leaving seven teams to start the season. Only six would finish however, as the Indianapolis Racers folded after 25 games on December 15, 1978. The remaining six teams each played 80 games, including one game each per team against a Soviet All-Star squad and the Czechoslovak National Team, the second consecutive year for this arrangement. The Soviet team won four of their six games and tied another; the Czechoslovak team only won once and tied once against four losses.  In addition, because the Racers had folded after playing an odd number of games, the Edmonton Oilers played the Finnish National Team (with future Oiler Jari Kurri) once at home so as to allow each of the six surviving WHA teams to play 80 regular season games. The Oilers won by a score of 8–4, a result which in itself made no difference by the end of the regular season which Edmonton won by an 11–point margin over the Quebec Nordiques.

During the season, an agreement was reached whereby four of the WHA's teams, the Edmonton Oilers, Quebec Nordiques, Winnipeg Jets and New England Whalers would be admitted to the National Hockey League (NHL) as expansion teams for the 1979–80 NHL season, and the WHA would cease operations.  The Cincinnati and Birmingham franchises were paid a sum to fold.

Regular season and playoff format
Nelson Skalbania, the owner of Indianapolis Racers, signed the 17-year-old future superstar Wayne Gretzky to, at that time, an unprecedented personal contract worth between $1.125 and $1.75 million over four to seven years. Then as now, the National Hockey League's rules did not permit the signing of 17-year-olds. Skalbania, knowing that the WHA's long-term prospects were poor, felt owning the young star was more valuable than owning a WHA team. Eight games into the season, though, Skalbania needed cash and sold Gretzky to his old friend and former partner, Peter Pocklington, owner of the Edmonton Oilers. Pocklington purchased Gretzky and two other Indianapolis players, goaltender Eddie Mio and forward Peter Driscoll, paying $700,000 for the contracts of the three players. On Gretzky's 18th birthday, Pocklington signed him to a 21-year personal services contract worth between $4 and $5 million, the longest in hockey history. Gretzky would go on to capture the Lou Kaplan Trophy for rookie of the year, finish third in league scoring, and help the Oilers to first overall in the league. Nevertheless the Winnipeg Jets defeated Edmonton in the Avco World Trophy finals winning their third championship overall and second in a row.

Playoff format:  The top five teams in the league qualified for the playoffs.  The fourth and fifth place teams started in a best-of-three quarterfinal series, while the top three finishers received byes into the semifinals.  In the semifinals, the first place team played the 4th/5th winner, while second place played third place.  Both semifinal series were best-of-seven.  Since the second and third place teams knew they would be playing each other in the semifinals, they started their series while the 4th/5th mini-series was still going on.  The finals, like the semifinals, were a best-of-seven.

Final standings
Note: W = Wins, L = Losses, T = Ties, GF= Goals for, GA = Goals against, Pts = Points

x-team folded during season
*-games counted in standings of the regular WHA teams

Player stats

Scoring leaders
Bolded numbers indicate season leaders

GP = Games played; G = Goals; A = Assists; Pts = Points; PIM = Penalty minutes

Leading goaltenders 
Bolded numbers indicate season leaders

GP = Games played; Min = Minutes played; W = Wins; L = Losses; T = Ties, GA = Goals against; GA = Goals against; SO = Shutouts; SV% = Save percentage; GAA = Goals against average

All-Star series: Howe and Gretzky
A WHA all-star team played three games against Dynamo Moscow at Edmonton's Northlands Coliseum. The WHA All-Stars were coached by Jacques Demers, who asked Gordie Howe if it was okay to put him on a line with his son Mark Howe and with Wayne Gretzky . In the first game, this line scored seven points, as the WHA All-Stars won by a score of 4-2. In the second game, Gretzky and Mark Howe each scored a goal and Gordie Howe picked up an assist as the WHA won 4-2. The line did not score in the final game but the WHA won by a score of 4-3.

Avco World Trophy playoffs

Playoff Bracket

Quarterfinals - New England Whalers 2, Cincinnati Stingers 1

Semifinals - Winnipeg Jets 4, Quebec Nordiques 0

Semifinals - Edmonton Oilers 4, New England Whalers 3

Avco Cup Finals - Winnipeg Jets 4, Edmonton Oilers 2

The Oilers' Dave Semenko scored late in the third period of the deciding game, to record the last goal in the history of the WHA. The goal was given up by the Winnipeg Jets Gary Smith.

WHA awards

Trophies

All-Star Team

See also
1978–79 NHL season
1979 NHL Expansion Draft
1978 in sports
1979 in sports

References

Notes

Bibliography
 The Rebel League: The Short and Unruly Life of the World Hockey Association, p. 219, McLelland and Stewart, Toronto, ON, .

External links
HockeyDB

1  Four of the WHA teams were admitted to the NHL as expansion franchises — the New England/Hartford Whalers, Quebec Nordiques, Edmonton Oilers, and Winnipeg Jets.

 
2
2
World Hockey Association seasons
WHA
WHA
WHA